The 1978–79 Honduran Liga Nacional season was the 13th edition of the Honduran Liga Nacional.  The format of the tournament remained the same as the previous season.  C.D. Motagua won the title after defeating Real C.D. España in the finals.  It's unclear why no Honduran representation was sent to the 1979 CONCACAF Champions' Cup.  Nevertheless, Motagua, Real España, Olimpia and Broncos obtained berths to the 1979 Copa Fraternidad.

1978–79 teams

 Broncos (Choluteca)
 Marathón (San Pedro Sula)
 Motagua (Tegucigalpa)
 Olimpia (Tegucigalpa)
 Platense (Puerto Cortés)
 Real España (San Pedro Sula)
 Tiburones (Choluteca, promoted)
 Universidad (Tegucigalpa)
 Victoria (La Ceiba)
 Vida (La Ceiba)

Regular season

Standings

Fifth place playoff

 Broncos advanced to Pentagonal on awarded points.

Final round

Pentagonal standings

Final

Top scorer
  Salvador Bernárdez (Motagua) with 15 goals

Squads

Known results

Round 1

Pentagonal place playoff

Pentagonal

Unknown rounds

References

Liga Nacional de Fútbol Profesional de Honduras seasons
1
Honduras